Jonathan "Johnny" Rodriguez (born June 13, 1998) is an American professional soccer player who plays as a striker for USL Championship club Oakland Roots.

Career
Rodriguez played six games in the 2020–21 NISA season, scoring two goals in the play-offs for Oakland Roots. He made his USL Championship debut on 18 August 2021 in a 1–1 draw with New Mexico United, coming on as a substitute. He made another substitute appearance against Las Vegas Lights FC on 21 August 2021.

Personal life
Rodriguez was born in Madera, California on 13 June 1998 to Alfonso Rodriguez and Raquel Gaytan. He was a liberal studies and interdisciplinary studies major at Cal State University at Northridge. He is a Real Madrid supporter, and his favorite player is Cristiano Ronaldo. His favorite basketball player is Chris Paul, his favorite comedian is Kevin Hart, his favorite actress is Allison Williams, his favorite television show is ESPN’s SportsCenter, his favorite movie is Jumanji, and his favorite singer is Drake. According to the CSUN website, “the best advice has been given is to ‘keep your head up’ [and] his advice to young people is to ‘keep working hard and never give up’”. Also according to the CSUN website, “his greatest heroes are his parents”.

References

External links
 

1998 births
Living people
American soccer players
Association football forwards
Cal State Northridge Matadors men's soccer players
National Independent Soccer Association players
Oakland Roots SC players
People from Madera, California
Soccer players from California
USL Championship players
USL League Two players
Ventura County Fusion players